was a railway station in Yūbari, Hokkaidō, Japan. The station was closed when the Yubari Branch Line ceased operation on 31 March 2019.

Lines
Numanosawa Station was served by the Sekisho Line Yūbari Branch. The station was numbered "Y21".

Station layout
The station had a ground-level side platform serving one track. Kitaca was not available. The station was unattended.

Adjacent stations

Surroundin area

References

Railway stations in Hokkaido Prefecture
Railway stations in Japan opened in 1905
Railway stations closed in 2019